Kebwe (Mikebwe) is a Bantu language of the Democratic Republic of the Congo. It was related to Hemba by Ahmed (1995).

References 

Luban languages
Languages of the Democratic Republic of the Congo